The Louis and Judith Miller Introduction to Judaism Program is an educational institute based at the American Jewish University in Bel Air, Los Angeles, California. It has, since its founding in 1986, helped thousands of students explore and deepen their Jewish roots or prepare for conversion to Judaism. Based primarily at AJU’s Familian Campus in Bel Air, as well as at a number of other Southern California locations and throughout the United States, the Miller Program helps people of all backgrounds find a home in the Jewish community.

The core of the Miller Introduction to Judaism Program is an 18-week course that surveys Jewish living and practice, including history, ritual, culture, texts, and values. Classes are designed to be highly interactive, with much time for discussion and questions, and include personalized instruction in reading Hebrew. In addition, the Miller Intro to Judaism Program offers its curriculum and resources to affiliates around the United States and Canada. During the 2018-2019 year, the Intro Program had more than fifty-five affiliates.

In addition to classes, the Miller Program offers regular Shabbat services and dinners, a support group for new and potential converts, and ongoing programming for alumni. The Miller Program is also a Los Angeles partner for Honeymoon Israel, a new, national initiative providing highly subsidized, immersive experiences in Israel for couples between the ages of 25-40. 
 
The Miller Program is under the direction of Rabbi Adam Greenwald. Rabbi Greenwald is a "Rabbis Without Borders" Fellow with Clal, the Center for Learning and Leadership and is a recipient of the Covenant Foundation's Pomegranate Prize in Jewish Education. Before coming to AJU and the Intro Program, Rabbi Greenwald served as the Revson Rabbinic Fellow of IKAR. Supervision of the Intro Program is provided by Rabbi Bradley Shavit Artson, Dean of the Ziegler School of Rabbinic Studies and Vice President of the AJU. 
 
The Miller Introduction to Judaism Program was named among the “Ten Best Classes in Los Angeles” by LA Weekly in its annual “Best of LA" 2012 edition. The Miller Program is endorsed by the Rabbinical Assembly of America, as well as by more than nearly 40 of LA’s top clergy—including Rabbi David Wolpe (Sinai Temple), Rabbi Sharon Brous (IKAR) and Rabbi Ed Feinstein (Valley Beth Shalom). Conversions performed under the auspices of the Miller Introduction to Judaism Program are recognized by the State of Israel for purposes of making Aliyah.

See also
American Jewish University
Conversion to Judaism
Proactive conversion

References

External links
 Miller Introduction to Judaism Program

Conversion to Judaism
Jews and Judaism in Los Angeles
American Jewish University